Sugar Tax may refer to:

Taxation
 A sugary drink tax
 UK sugary drink tax, a tax on sugary drinks included in the 2016 United Kingdom budget
 Sugar Act, 1700s UK law

Music
 Sugar Tax (album), an album by Orchestral Manoeuvres in the Dark
 "Sugar Tax", a song by Orchestral Manoeuvres in the Dark from the B-side of "Then You Turn Away"